Malcolm White Perkins (August 18, 1888 – March 19, 1965) was an American lawyer and politician who served for many years as circuit court clerk of Fluvanna County as well as one term in the Virginia House of Delegates.

References

External links 

1888 births
1965 deaths
Democratic Party members of the Virginia House of Delegates
20th-century American politicians